The C. F. Streit Mfg. Co. was a furniture maker located on  Kenner St. in Cincinnati, Ohio. Streit manufactured a number of adjustable furniture pieces, most notably the Slumber Chair which had a combination upholstered seat and back element which could be inclined at various angles.  Streit also manufactured a Slumber Davenport with a fold down back which converted to a bed.  The Streit Shakespeare Chair was a shallow theater chair with a flip-up upholstered seat.

Patents

 
 , February 14, 1880, Extension Lounge
 
 
 
 
 
 
 , February 19, 1901, Foot Rest For Chairs
 
 
 
 , June 26, 1928, Chair
 , July 9, 1929, Chair
 
 
 , August 13, 1943, Chair

External links
  Slumber Davenports - Fall Styles, C.F. Streit Mfg. Co. (1911) Kenneth Franzheim II Rare Books Room, William R. Jenkins Architecture and Art Library, University of Houston Digital Library.

Defunct furniture manufacturers
History of Cincinnati
Defunct manufacturing companies based in Ohio
Manufacturing companies based in Cincinnati